"The Code" is a song by American rapper King Von, released on October 30, 2020 with an accompanying music video. It is the sixth single from his debut studio album Welcome to O'Block (2020) and features vocals from American rapper Polo G.

Composition 
The song features a "sinister piano loop" in its instrumental. Von and Polo rap about sticking to the code of the streets by not being an informant.

Music video 
The music video was directed by DrewFilmedIt and Jon Primo. It was released on Von’s YouTube channel on October 30, 2020. In it, the rappers trap their enemies using a computer program and torture them with the help of a "scantily clad assistant."

Charts

Certifications

References 

2020 singles
2020 songs
Empire Distribution singles
King Von songs
Polo G songs
Songs written by Polo G